Toni Pulkkinen (born November 1, 1990) is a Finnish professional ice hockey player who currently plays for Jokerit of the SM-liiga.

References

External links

1990 births
Living people
Finnish ice hockey forwards
Jokerit players
Sportspeople from Vantaa